The Americas Zone was one of the three zones of the regional Davis Cup competition in 1989.

In the Americas Zone there were two different tiers, called groups, in which teams competed against each other to advance to the upper tier.

Group I
Winners in Group I advanced to the World Group Qualifying Round, along with losing teams from the World Group first round. Teams who lost their respective first round ties competed in the relegation play-off, with the winning teams remaining in Group I, whereas the team who lost their play-off was relegated to the Americas Zone Group II in 1990.

Participating nations

Draw

  and  advance to World Group Qualifying Round.

  relegated to Group II in 1990.

First round

Peru vs. Ecuador

Canada vs. Uruguay

Second round

Peru vs. Brazil

Argentina vs. Canada

Relegation play-off

Uruguay vs. Ecuador

Group II
The winner in Group II advanced to the Americas Zone Group I in 1990.

Participating nations

Draw

  promoted to Group I in 1990.

First round

Jamaica vs. Chile

Colombia vs. Cuba

Dominican Republic vs. Bolivia

Bahamas vs. Venezuela

Second round

Cuba vs. Chile

Bahamas vs. Dominican Republic

Third round

Bahamas vs. Chile

References

External links
Davis Cup official website

Davis Cup Americas Zone
Americas Zone